Ileal sodium/bile acid cotransporter, also known as apical sodium–bile acid transporter (ASBT) and ileal bile acid transporter (IBAT), is a bile acid:sodium symporter protein that in humans is encoded by the SLC10A2 gene.

ASBT/IBAT is  most highly expressed in the ileum, where it is found on the brush border membrane of enterocytes.  It is responsible for the initial uptake of bile acids, particularly conjugated bile acids, from the intestine as part of their enterohepatic circulation.

As a drug target 

Several medications to inhibit IBAT are under development. They include elobixibat, under development for the treatment of constipation and irritable bowel syndrome, and volixibat, under development for the treatment of nonalcoholic steatohepatitis.

See also 
 Solute carrier family

References

Further reading 

 
 
 
 
 
 
 
 
 
 
 
 
 
 
 
 

Solute carrier family